Sir Robert Lee (c. 1550 - 22 December 1606) was an English merchant who was Lord Mayor of London in 1602.

Lee was a city of London merchant and a member of the Worshipful Company of Merchant Taylors. On 18 December 1593,  he was elected an alderman of the City of London for Dowgate ward. He was Sheriff of London from 1594 to 1595. He became alderman for Cordwainer ward from 1599 to 1602, and for Langbourn ward from 1602 to 1605. In 1602, he was elected Lord Mayor of London. He was knighted on 22 May 1603
 
Lee married a daughter of Sir James Hawes, alderman of the City of London in 1565, and Lord Mayor in 1574. He was father of Sir Henry Lee, alderman in 1614 and father-in-law of William Gore. Following his death, his widow married Sir Thomas Gerard, 1st Baronet of Bryn.

References

1550s births
Year of birth uncertain
1605 deaths
English merchants
Sheriffs of the City of London
17th-century lord mayors of London